Jersey, one of the Channel Islands, is a self-governing Crown dependency with its own legal system. Laws are passed and amended by the elected parliament, the States Assembly.

21st century

2001–2010

2001

2002

2003
Advocates And Solicitors (Amendment No. 3) (Jersey) Law 2003 	L-24-2003 
Civil Evidence (Jersey) Law 2003 	L-14-2003 
Crime (Going Equipped) (Jersey) Law 2003 	L-10-2003 
Crime And Security (Jersey) Law 2003 	L-32-2003 
Criminal Justice (Suspension Of Prison Sentences) (Jersey) Law 2003 	L-44-2003 
Customs And Excise (Amendment) (Jersey) Law 2003 	L-25-2003  
Dogs (Amendment No. 2) (Jersey) Law 2003 	L-15-2003 
Employment (Jersey) Law 2003 	L-42-2003 
Family Allowances (Amendment No. 6) (Jersey) Law 2003 	L-26-2003 
Finance (Jersey) Law 2003 	L-21-2003 
Fire Service (Amendment No. 5) (Jersey) Law 2003 	L-27-2003 
Health Insurance (Amendment No. 13) (Jersey) Law 2003 	L-28-2003 
Income Tax (Amendment No. 22) (Jersey) Law 2003 	L-22-2003 
Insurance Business (Amendment No. 4) (Jersey) Law 2003 	L-09-2003 
Interpretation (Amendment) (Jersey) Law 2003 	L-16-2003 
Investigation Of Fraud (Amendment No. 2) (Jersey) Law 2003 	L-33-2003 
Jersey Advisory And Conciliation (Jersey) Law 2003 	L-11-2003 
Jersey Association For Mental Health And Jersey Schizophrenia Fellowship (Integration With Jersey Focus On Mental Health) (Jersey) Law 2003 	L-34-2003 
Law Granting An Act Of Incorporation To The Association Called "The Haut De La Garenne Trust" 	L-01-2003 
Law Reform (Miscellaneous Provisions) (Jersey) Law 2003  	L-02-2003 
Law Revision (Jersey) Law 2003 	L-35-2003 
Loi (2003) (Amendement) Au Sujet Des Centeniers Et Officiers De Police 	L-19-2003 
Matrimonial Causes (Amendment No. 11) (Jersey) Law 2003 	L-43-2003 
Misuse Of Drugs (Amendment No. 3) (Jersey) Law 2003 	L-12-2003 
Motor Traffic (Third Party Insurance) (Amendment No. 11) (Jersey) Law 2003 	L-36-2003 
Motor Vehicle Registration (Amendment No. 2) (Jersey) Law 2003 	L-37-2003 
Nursing And Residential Homes (Amendment) (Jersey) Law 2003 	L-03-2003 
Official Publications (Amendment) (Jersey) Law 2003 	L-17-2003 
Opticians (Registration) (Amendment) (Jersey) Law 2003 	L-38-2003 
Parish Rate (Administration) (Amendment) (Jersey) Law 2003 	L-29-2003 
Parish Rate (Administration) (Jersey) Law 2003 	L-18-2003 
Parish Rate (Jersey) Law 2003  	L-04-2003 
Parish Rate (No. 2) (Jersey) Law 2003 	L-39-2003 
Plant Health (Jersey) Law 2003 	L-30-2003 
Police Force (Amendment No. 9) (Jersey) Law 2003 	L-31-2003 
Police Procedures And Criminal Evidence (Jersey) Law 2003 	L-05-2003 
Public Elections (Amendment) (Jersey) Law 2003 	L-20-2003 
Public Finances (Administration) (Amendment No. 11) (Jersey) Law 2003 	L-06-2003 
Public Holidays And Bank Holidays (Amendment No. 2) (Jersey) Law 2003 	L-07-2003 
Shipping (Amendment) (Jersey) Law 2003 	L-40-2003 
Subordinate Legislation (Amendment No. 3) (Jersey) Law 2003 	L-13-2003 
The Immigration And Asylum Act 1999 (Jersey) Order 2003 	Oinc-23-2003 
Water (Amendment No. 2) (Jersey) Law 2003 	L-41-2003 
Water Pollution (Amendment) (Jersey) Law 2003 	L-08-2003

2004
Agricultural Marketing (Amendment No. 7) (Jersey) Law 2004 L-04-2004
Animal Welfare (Jersey) Law 2004 L-27-2004
Banking Business (Amendment No. 4) (Jersey) Law 2004 L-16-2004 
Burials And Exhumations (Jersey) Law 2004 L-22-2004
Christmas Bonus (Amendment No. 2) (Jersey) Law 2004 L-29-2004 
Customs And Excise (Amendment No. 2) (Jersey) Law 2004 L-12-2004
Extradition (Jersey) Law 2004 L-24-2004
Finance (Jersey) Law 2004 L-13-2004
Hire Cars (Repeal) (Jersey) Law 2004 L-05-2004
Honorary Police (Parochial Domicile) (Amendment) (Jersey) Law 2004 L-18-2004
Housing (Amendment No. 11) (Jersey) Law 2004 L-15-2004
Income Tax (Amendment No. 23) (Jersey) Law 2004 L-20-2004
Jersey Legal Information Board (Incorporation) Law 2004 L-17-2004 
Loi (2004) (Amendement No. 10) Reglant La Procedure Criminelle L-14-2004
Mental Health (Amendment) (Jersey) Law 2004 L-08-2004
Motor Vehicle Registration (Amendment No. 3) (Jersey) Law 2004 L-10-2004
Non-Contributory Pensions (Repeal) (Jersey) Law 2004 L-25-2004
Nursing And Residential Homes (Amendment No. 2) (Jersey) Law 2004 L-30-2004
Police Force (Amendment No. 10) (Jersey) Law 2004 L-09-2004
Postal Services (Jersey) Law 2004 L-26-2004
Prison (Amendment No. 5) (Jersey) Law 2004 L-21-2004
Privileges And Immunities (Diplomatic, Consular, Etc.) (Amendment) (Jersey) Law 2004 L-19-2004
Protection Of Children (Amendment No. 3) (Jersey) Law 2004 L-06-2004
Social Security (Amendment No. 17) (Jersey) Law 2004 L-23-2004
Taxation (Implementation) (Jersey) Law 2004 L-28-2004 
The Broadcasting (Jersey) Order 2003 OinC-02-2004
The Broadcasting And Communications (Jersey) Order 2004 L-07-2004
The Communications (Jersey) Order 2003 OinC-03-2004
The Nuclear Safeguards (Jersey) Order 2004 OinC-11-2004
The Wireless Telegraphy (Jersey) Order 2003 OinC-01-2004

2005

Bankruptcy (Netting, Contractual Subordination And Non-Petition Provisions) (Jersey) Law 2005 L-19-2005
Child Abduction And Custody (Jersey) Law 2005 L-29-2005
Child Custody (Jurisdiction) (Jersey) Law 2005 L-28-2005
Children And Day Care (Amendment) (Jersey) Law 2005 L-36-2005
Companies (Amendment No. 8) (Jersey) Law 2005  L-37-2005
Competition (Jersey) Law 2005 L-06-2005
Criminal Justice (Mandatory Minimum Periods Of Actual Imprisonment) (Jersey) Law 2005 L-11-2005
Criminal Law (Child Abduction) (Jersey) Law 2005 L-27-2005
Data Protection (Jersey) Law 2005 L-02-2005
Data Protection (Amendment) (Jersey) Law 2005 L-16-2005
Diseases Of Animals (Amendment No. 6) (Jersey) Law 2005  L-30-2005
Drainage (Jersey) Law 2005 L-03-2005
Education (Amendment) (Jersey) Law 2005 L-31-2005
Employment (Amendment) (Jersey) Law 2005 L-39-2005
Employment Of States Of Jersey Employees (Jersey) Law 2005 L-26-2005 
Fertilisers And Feeding Stuffs (Amendment) (Jersey) Law 2005 L-20-2005
Finance (Jersey) Law 2005 L-13-2005
Financial Services (Amendment No. 2) (Jersey) Law 2005 L-01-2005
Income Tax (Amendment No. 24) (Jersey) Law 2005 L-12-2005
Island Planning (Amendment No. 9) (Jersey) Law 2005 L-34-2005
Jersey Overseas Aid Commission (Jersey) Law 2005 L-24-2005
Liquor (Restrictions On Consumption) (Jersey) Law 2005 L-38-2005 
Loi (2005) (Amendement No. 5) Sur La Propriété Foncière L-23-2005
Medicines (Amendment No. 2) (Jersey) Law 2005 L-10-2005
Planning And Building (Amendment) (Jersey) Law 2005 L-18-2005
Planning And Building (Amendment No. 2) (Jersey) Law 2005 L-25-2005
Planning And Building (Amendment No. 3) (Jersey) Law 2005 L-35-2005
Public Employees (Retirement) (Validation And Amendment) (Jersey) Law 2005 L-04-2005
Public Finances (Jersey) Law 2005 L-14-2005
Rates (Jersey) Law 2005 L-33-2005
Regulation Of Investigatory Powers (Jersey) Law 2005 L-17-2005
Road Traffic (Amendment No. 3) (Jersey) Law 2005 L-05-2005
Royal Court (Amendment No. 11) (Jersey) Law 2005 L-15-2005
Social Security (Amendment No. 18) (Jersey) Law 2005 L-32-2005
States Of Jersey Law 2005 L-08-2005
States Of Jersey (Amendment) Law 2005 L-22-2005
Termination Of Pregnancy (Amendment) (Jersey) Law 2005 L-21-2005
The Law Society of Jersey Law 2005 L-09-2005
Waste Management (Jersey) Law 2005 L-07-2005

2006
Animal Welfare (Amendment) (Jersey) Law 2006 	L-07-2006 
Emergency Powers and Planning (Amendment No. 2) (Jersey) Law 2006 L-09-2006
Highways (Amendment No. 4) (Jersey) Law 2006 	L-08-2006 
Housing (Amendment No. 12) (Jersey) Law 2006 	L-05-2006 
Law Revision (Amendment) (Jersey) Law 2006
Law Revision (Miscellaneous Provisions) (Jersey) Law 2006 	L-06-2006 
Petroleum (Amendment No. 2) (Jersey) Law 2006 	L-04-2006 
Public Finances (Amendment) (Jersey) Law 2006 	L-03-2006 
Restriction On Smoking (Amendment) (Jersey) Law 2006 	L-01-2006 
States of Jersey (Amendment No. 2) Law 2006 	L-02-2006
Terrorism (Amendment) (Jersey) Law 2006

External links
Jersey Legal Information Board

Jersey
 
Laws